Antennaria is a genus of dioecious perennial herbs in the family Asteraceae, native to temperate regions of the Northern Hemisphere, with a few species (A. chilensis, A. linearifolia, A. sleumeri) in temperate southern South America; the highest species diversity is in North America. Common names include catsfoot or cat's-foot, pussytoes and everlasting.

Different Antennaria species reach between 10 cm and 50 cm in height. The leaves are basal and often stem leaves. The name Antennaria refers to the projecting stamens seen on the male flowers of some species, resembling insect antennae. 

Antennaria species are used as food plants by the larvae of some Lepidoptera species including Vanessa virginiensis (American painted lady), Coleophora pappiferella (which feeds exclusively on A. dioica), Schinia verna (which feeds on several Antennaria species).

Selected species

Hybrids
Antennaria × erigeroides Greene (pro sp.)
Antennaria × foliacea Greene (pro sp.)
Antennaria × macounii Greene (pro sp.)
Antennaria × oblancifolia E.Nels. (pro sp.)

Gallery

References

External links
Flora Europaea: Antennaria

 
Asteraceae genera
Dioecious plants